"You Learn" is a song by Canadian singer-songwriter Alanis Morissette from her third studio album, Jagged Little Pill (1995). It was written by Morissette and Glen Ballard, the album's producer. Maverick and Warner Bros. Records released the song as the album's fourth single (third in the United Kingdom). The lyrics state that valuable lessons are learned from poor decisions. The album title is taken from this song's line "Swallow it down (what a jagged little pill)".

Released in the United Kingdom in February 1996 and issued around the world later in the year, the song received generally positive reviews from most music critics, many highlighting the song as an album standout. It was a commercial success globally, topping the Canadian RPM Top Singles chart and entering the top 40 in Australia, Iceland, New Zealand, the United Kingdom, and the United States. In Canada, it was the most successful single of 1996, according to RPM. A music video was shot for the single, showing Morissette walking through the streets.

Background
During Morissette's stay in Los Angeles to record "You Learn" and other parts of Jagged Little Pill, she was robbed on an empty street by a man with a gun, after which she developed intense general anxiety and suffered daily panic attacks. She was hospitalized and attended psychotherapy sessions, to no avail. As she later said in interviews, Morissette focused all her inner problems on the soul-baring lyrics of the album, for her health. According to Morissette, Ballard was her first collaborator who encouraged her to express her emotions.

Jagged Little Pill was not an instant success. To promote it, "You Learn" was chosen as the fourth single. Because the CD single includes a live version of "You Oughta Know" from the 1996 Grammy Awards as an A-side, Billboard credited the chart position to "You Learn"/"You Oughta Know".  An acoustic version of the song from Morissette's live album Alanis Unplugged (1999) was released as a single in some countries in 2000. Another acoustic version was recorded for the album Jagged Little Pill Acoustic (2005).

Reception

Critical reception
"You Learn" got positive reviews from music critics, with many finding the lyrics' message positive. Stephen Thomas Erlewine, of AllMusic, highlighted it as an album standout, but separately gave the song two and a half of five stars. Larry Flick from Billboard felt that "this could easily become Morissette's crowning hit, with its shrewdly R&B-flavoured shuffle beat and sugar-coated guitar scratching—not to mention its instantly hummable, almost anthemic chorus." A reviewer for CultureFusion wrote, of the song, "It highlights the album fairly well, creating a mood of 'pissed but positive.' I guess it could be more 'devil may care' but that's not the point. It's another great track and was well worth the single status. Glad it's still popular!" Music Week gave it four of five, describing it as a "mellower, more mainstream single". John Murphy, of MusicOMH, wrote, "'You Oughta Know' and 'You Learn' have a lightness of touch that nicely balance[s] the darkness of the subject matter.'" A reviewer for PopStasche wrote "After 'Right [t]hrough You' and 'Forgiven' display the vocal talent at hand, we're graced with the wonder of 'You Learn.' It provides a break from the fiery frustration yet still proves to have soul through its repetition and humility. There it goes again with its iconic beauty and all."

Chart performance
"You Learn" was a worldwide success. The song was the album's third single to reach number one in Canada and peaked at number six on the Billboard Hot 100, charting high from strong airplay following "Ironic". It reached number one on the US Pop Songs chart and number seven on the US Modern Rock Tracks chart.

The song had debuted at number twenty-four on the UK Singles Chart and then fell to seventy-three. It started at number thirty-two on the Australian Singles Chart, and peaked at number twenty after five weeks, and stayed in the charts for twelve weeks in total. The song debuted at number thirteen on the New Zealand Singles Chart.

Music video
There were two music videos produced for the single. The original music video, directed by Liz Friedlander, starts with Morissette, hair in dreadlocks, handstanding in her apartment. She puts on a white sports jacket, leaves the apartment by the fire escape, and carelessly crosses the street, causing a multi-car accident and an ensuing riot. Morissette ignores the riot, walking on top of the cars that get in her way. After passing by a fire truck, Morissette arrives at an indoor basketball arena on a horse where she, now in a red jacket, successfully throws a ball passed to her into the basket. Morissette then exits the arena to the street and performs backflips through it. By the time she finishes, she is wearing a grey jacket. She randomly kisses a man on the same street and runs to an unfinished bridge, now wearing a green jacket. She jumps from the ledge, lands wearing a blue jacket, and soon engages in a pie fight with a group of people, including her touring drummer Taylor Hawkins. Finally, Morissette emerges in a boxing ring wearing a black jacket and boxing gloves and faces off with a woman in complete boxing gear. The woman punches her in the face, knocking Morissette to the mat. Morissette staggers to her feet and wobbly exits the ring and walks out of the gym as the video ends. 

The video was shot on February 11, 1996, in New York City's Meatpacking District. Filming took 23 hours in 10° weather. It features the Twin Towers in a scene where Morissette does tumbling. Morissette also is never seen singing throughout the duration of the clip. 

The second music video features Morissette with her band live during a live performance. Some clips include her performing from the MTV Unplugged video. The live version was used instead of the album version.

Live performances and other versions
"You Learn" was performed at her worldwide tour Jagged Little Pill Tour. It was performed at her Junkie Tour and the Australian leg as well. It was performed at her Under Rug Swept tour and her Flavors of Entanglement Tour. Another acoustic version was featured for the single on her 2005 Jagged Little Pill Acoustic album. An instrumental version also leaked online.

Because the CD single includes a live version of "You Oughta Know" from the 1996 Grammy Awards as an A-side, Billboard credited the chart position to "You Learn"/"You Oughta Know". An acoustic version of the song from Morissette's live album Alanis Unplugged (1999) was released as a single in some countries in 2000. Another acoustic version was recorded for the album Jagged Little Pill Acoustic (2005).

Covers
The Bacon Brothers covered "You Learn" on their 2014 release, 36 Cents.

The American TV series Glee used this song in a mashup with Carole King's You've Got a Friend for the season six episode "Jagged Little Tapestry", a tribute to both King's album Tapestry and Morisette's Jagged Little Pill. It was performed by Rachel Berry (Lea Michele), Santana Lopez (Naya Rivera), Brittany Pierce (Heather Morris), Tina Cohen-Chang (Jenna Ushkowitz), Quinn Fabray (Dianna Agron), and Kurt Hummel (Chris Colfer) with their almamater high school's glee club.

Track listings
"Your House" was recorded at Ebisu Garden Hall on November 4, 1995. "Wake Up" was recorded in Los Angeles on November 12, 1995.

 US CD, 7-inch, and cassette single
 "You Learn" (album version) – 3:58
 "You Oughta Know" (live Grammy version) – 3:48

 UK, European, and Australian CD single
 "You Learn" (album version) – 4:42
 "Your House" (live in Tokyo) – 3:03
 "Wake Up" (Modern Rock Live) – 5:07
 "Hand in My Pocket" (album version) – 3:37

 UK and Australian cassette single
 "You Learn" (album version) – 4:42
 "Your House" (live in Tokyo) – 3:03

 Japanese CD single
 "You Learn" (album version)
 "You Learn" (acoustic version)
 "You Oughta Know" (The Jimmy the Saint Blend / clean version)

Charts

Weekly charts

Year-end charts

Decade-end charts

Release history

References

1995 songs
1996 singles
Alanis Morissette songs
Maverick Records singles
Music videos directed by Liz Friedlander
Reprise Records singles
RPM Top Singles number-one singles
Songs written by Alanis Morissette
Songs written by Glen Ballard